Webster Township is a township in Wilson County, Kansas, in the United States.

History
Webster Township was established in 1890.

References

Townships in Wilson County, Kansas
Townships in Kansas